Alexandros Nikolaidis (17 October 1979 – 14 October 2022) was a Greek taekwondo athlete. He was named the 2008 Greek Male Athlete of the Year. Initially the home favorite, he won the silver medal at the 2004 Olympics held in Athens after losing to Moon Dae-Sung of South Korea in the gold medal match.

On 24 March 2008, Alexandros Nikolaidis had the honour to be the first torch-bearer of the 2008 Summer Olympics torch relay.

Later in the same year on 11 April, he won the European Championship in Rome.

At the 2008 Beijing Olympics, Nikolaidis won another Olympic silver medal in the +80 kg category, after losing to Cha Dong-Min of South Korea in the final.

In July 2011, he managed to secure a place at the 2012 Olympic Games by placing third in the 2011 World Taekwondo Olympic Qualification Tournament in Baku, Azerbaijan by defeating Liu Xiaobo of China in the 3rd place play-off.  He carried the flag for Greece during the Parade of Nations at the 2012 Summer Olympics in London.

On 11 August 2012, Nikolaidis began and ended his Olympics participation in a "preliminary round" bout against Bahri Tanrikulu. Nikolaidis lost 7–3 overall.

Nikolaidis retired in 2014. He died on 14 October 2022, at the age of 42. Nikolaidis had been suffering from an "extremely rare" form of cancer for two years prior to his death.

References

1979 births
2022 deaths
Sportspeople from Thessaloniki
Greek male taekwondo practitioners
Olympic taekwondo practitioners of Greece
Olympic silver medalists for Greece
Taekwondo practitioners at the 2000 Summer Olympics
Taekwondo practitioners at the 2004 Summer Olympics
Taekwondo practitioners at the 2008 Summer Olympics
Taekwondo practitioners at the 2012 Summer Olympics
Olympic medalists in taekwondo
Medalists at the 2008 Summer Olympics
Medalists at the 2004 Summer Olympics
European champions for Greece
Mediterranean Games silver medalists for Greece
Competitors at the 2013 Mediterranean Games
Mediterranean Games medalists in taekwondo
European Taekwondo Championships medalists
World Taekwondo Championships medalists
21st-century Greek people